Riverside Estates is a hamlet in Saskatchewan, approximately  south of the city of Saskatoon.

Riverside Estates was declared an organized hamlet on April 5, 1992. At the request of its residents, it was reverted to hamlet status on January 1, 1999.

References

Corman Park No. 344, Saskatchewan
Organized hamlets in Saskatchewan